Brindley Heath is a civil parish in the district of Cannock Chase, Staffordshire, England.  The parish contains four listed buildings that are recorded in the National Heritage List for England.  All the listed buildings are designated at Grade II, the lowest of the three grades, which is applied to "buildings of national importance and special interest".  All the listed buildings are stones marking the boundary between two parishes.


Buildings

References

Citations

Sources

Lists of listed buildings in Staffordshire